The Ebenezer Missionary Baptist Church is a church on the National Register of Historic Places in Auburn, Alabama.  Ebenezer Baptist Church was the first African American church built in the Auburn area after the end of the Civil War in 1865.  Over the next few years, the church members built the church out of hand-hewn logs, transported from miles away by mules.  The church was completed around 1870 and served the Ebenezer congregation until 1969.  The building was restored in 1970 by the Auburn Heritage Association, and currently houses the Auburn Unitarian Universalist Fellowship.

The Ebenezer Missionary Baptist Church was placed on the National Register of Historic Places on May 21, 1975.

See also
National Register of Historic Places listings in Lee County, Alabama

References

Historic Chattahoochee Commission and Auburn Heritage Association (1994). Ebenezer Church/Baptist Hill/East Thatch Avenue.  Historic Marker.  Located 450 E. Thach Avenue, Auburn, Ala.
Logue, Mickey & Simms, Jack (1996). Auburn:  A Pictorial History of the Loveliest Village, Revised.  Auburn, Ala. 

Buildings and structures in Auburn, Alabama
National Register of Historic Places in Lee County, Alabama
Churches on the National Register of Historic Places in Alabama
Churches in Lee County, Alabama
Baptist churches in Alabama
Churches completed in 1870
19th-century Baptist churches in the United States